Noviherbaspirillum aurantiacum is a Gram-negative and motile bacterium from the genus of Noviherbaspirillum which has been isolated from old volcanic mountain soil.

References

 

Burkholderiales
Bacteria described in 2012